The 1997 Gent–Wevelgem was the 59th edition of the Gent–Wevelgem cycle race and was held on 9 April 1997. The race started in Ghent and finished in Wevelgem. The race was won by Philippe Gaumont of the Cofidis team.

General classification

References

Gent–Wevelgem
1997 in road cycling
1997 in Belgian sport